GRE is the Graduate Record Examinations, a standardized test created and administered by the Educational Testing Service in the United States.

GRE may also refer to:

Organizations and enterprises
 GRE (company) (General Research of Electronics, Inc.), former Japanese electronics  manufacturer
 Guardian Royal Exchange Assurance, former British insurance company

Science and technology
 Generic Routing Encapsulation, a type of tunnel used on routers
 Gradient recalled echo, or gradient echo, a type of magnetic resonance imaging sequence
 Glycpeptide resistant enterococci, also Vancomycin resistant enterococci (VRE), a bacterium resistant to antimicrobials

Sport

 Greece national football team (FIFA country code GRE)
 Greece at the Olympics (IOC country code GRE)

Other uses
 Great Russian Encyclopedia